Events in the year 2013 in Monaco.

Incumbents 
 Monarch: Albert II
 State Minister: Michel Roger

Events

January to June 
 20 January – Sébastien Loeb won the Monte Carlo Rally.
 10 February – Following the general election, Horizon Monaco, a conservative political coalition, won the majority of seats in the National Council.
 21 April – Novak Djokovic defeated eight-time defending champion Rafael Nadal in the 2013 Monte-Carlo Rolex Masters.
 25 May – Stefano Coletti won the final race of the 2013 Monaco GP2 Series round.
 26 May – Nico Rosberg won the 2013 Monaco Grand Prix.
 9–13 June – The Monte-Carlo Television Festival was held, with awards going to Bryan Cranston, Ty Burrell, Ivan Trojan, Sofie Gråbøl, Julieta Cardinali, Tina Fey, Christine Neubauer, Niall McCormick, etc. See full list:

July to December 
 31 August – Andrea Casiraghi, nephew of the Sovereign Prince, civilly married Tatiana Santo Domingo.
 September – Prince Albert II visited Cody, Wyoming in a symbolic gesture to mark the centennial of the visit to the same by his great-great-grandfather Prince Albert I.
 30 October – AS Monaco FC made it to the third round of Coupe de la Ligue, playing against and losing to Stade de Reims, 1–0.

Deaths

See also 

 2013 in Europe
 City states

References 

 
Years of the 21st century in Monaco
2010s in Monaco
Monaco
Monaco